The Tunnsjødal Power Station  (Tunnsjødal kraftverk) is a hydroelectric power station located in Namsskogan, Nord-Trøndelag, Norway.

See also

References 

Hydroelectric power stations in Norway
Buildings and structures in Trøndelag